Belgium competed at the 2019 World Championships in Athletics in Doha, Qatar from 27 September to 6 October 2019. Belgium has entered 29 athletes. The country finished in 24th place in the medal table.

Medalists 

* – Indicates the athlete competed in preliminaries but not the final

Entrants
 including alternates
Key
Note–Ranks given for track events are within the athlete's heat only
Q = Qualified for the next round
q = Qualified for the next round as a fastest loser or, in field events, by position without achieving the qualifying target
NR = National record
CHB = Championship best
WL = World Leading
PB = Personal best
SB = Season's best
N/A = Round not applicable for the event
Bye = Athlete not required to compete in round
DNS = Did not start
NM = No valid trial recorded

Men

Track and road events

Field events

Combined events – Decathlon

Women

Track and road events

Field events

Combined events – Heptathlon

Mixed

Track and road events

References

Belgium
World Championships in Athletics
2019